Nada personal (English: Nothing Personal) is a Mexican telenovela produced by TV Azteca.  It is a new adaptation of the telenovela written by the Venezuelan author Alberto Barrera Tyszka, which was released in 1996 with the same name. It premiered on May 22, 2017 and ended on September 5, 2017.

The series stars Margarita Muñoz as Mariana, Matías Novoa as Santiago, Valentino Lanús as Alejandro and Juan Soler as Raúl.

Synopsis 
Due to a coincidence, Mariana Aragón witnesses the murder of two young journalists. This puts her in the middle of a conspiracy she never imagined. A criminal organization makes her guilty and addicted. For Mariana, fighting for her life involves facing the most powerful criminal organization: the one that works from the legal, within the State.

Cast 
 Valentino Lanús as Alejandro Castillo
 Margarita Muñoz as Mariana Aragón
 Matías Novoa as Santiago Leal
 Juan Soler as Raúl Rey
 Kika Edgar as Claudia Campos
 Orlando Moguel as Ernesto
 Héctor Kotsifakis as El Tuétano
 Silvia Carusillo as Silvia Carrasco

Production 
Production of the series began on March 28, 2017.

Background 
The trailer for the series was recorded with Gabriela de la Garza in the lead role as Mariana Aragón. At the beginning of the production, De la Garza was confirmed as the main character of the series, but later it was confirmed that the actress had not reached any agreement with Azteca TV to be part of the series.

Opening theme 
The main theme of the telenovela is a new version of the 1996 song "Nada personal" composed by Armando Manzanero and interpreted by Manzanero and Lisset. On May 19, 2017 was published in the account of Azteca Novelas the official video of the song composed by Manzanero and interpreted Ximena Sariñana and Jesús Navarro.

References

External links 
 

TV Azteca telenovelas
2017 telenovelas
2017 Mexican television series debuts
2017 Mexican television series endings
Mexican telenovelas
Television series reboots
Spanish-language telenovelas